Bugs 'n' Daffy (formerly That's Warner Bros.!) is an American animated anthology television series that aired on The WB from 1995 to 1998 as part of their Kids' WB weekday lineup. The series featured cartoons from Warner Bros.' library of Looney Tunes and Merrie Melodies shorts. A weekly companion series, The Daffy Duck Show aired on Saturday mornings from 1996 to 1997.

This series is not to be confused with Cartoon Network's former block of Warner shorts, The Bugs & Daffy Show.

History and format
That's Warner Bros.! premiered on September 11, 1995 as part of Kids' WB's inaugural season, on their weekday lineup alongside classic episodes of Animaniacs. The show's title sequence reutilized the opening for the Fox Kids version of Merrie Melodies Starring Bugs Bunny & Friends, now scored with a jazzy rendition of "Merrily We Roll Along" and with a different ending showing the show's title. 65 episodes were created featuring three cartoons in each, with a "Hip Clip" (a holdover from Merrie Melodies) placed in between the second and third shorts to fill up any remaining time. Unlike Merrie Melodies before it, not every episode featured a Bugs Bunny cartoon.

The following season, That's Warner Bros.! was renamed Bugs 'n' Daffy, which brought forth several changes to the format. Each show now began with a new title sequence set to an original theme song by Animaniacs composer Randy Rogel. In addition, the cartoons' staff credits were cut, leaving only a shot of their titles with a sting based on the theme song playing underneath them. Other than these changes, the contents of the original 65 episodes remained mostly the same.

For the 1997–98 season, a new set of 65 episodes were created. Thanks to Time Warner's merger with Turner Broadcasting System on October 10, 1996, Warner Bros. had regained the broadcast rights to Turner's package of color Looney Tunes and Merrie Melodies made before August 1948; at least one cartoon from the pre-1948 package was included in each episode (though some aired on The Daffy Duck Show first). Because of the lengths of those shorts, not every episode featured a "Hip Clip".

Bugs 'n' Daffy was removed from the Kids' WB lineup at the start of the 1998–99 season, although some affiliates were allowed to air the series as a replacement for Tiny Toon Adventures.

The Daffy Duck Show
On November 23, 1996, a companion series titled The Daffy Duck Show began airing on Kids' WB's Saturday morning lineup as a replacement for the low-rated Freakazoid!. Each episode featured two Daffy Duck cartoons, with one featuring another character in between them. 13 episodes of The Daffy Duck Show were created, airing weekly until the start of the 1997–98 season.

References

External links 
 

1990s American animated television series
1995 American television series debuts
1998 American television series endings
1990s American anthology television series
Looney Tunes television series
Television series by Warner Bros. Television Studios
American children's animated anthology television series
The WB original programming
Kids' WB original shows
English-language television shows
Bugs Bunny
Animated television series about ducks
Animated television series about rabbits and hares